Edward Bernard Scharfenberger (born May 29, 1948) is an American prelate of the Roman Catholic Church who has been serving as the tenth bishop of the Diocese of Albany in Upstate New York since 2014.

Biography

Early life and education
Scharfenberger was born on May 29, 1948, in Bushwick, Brooklyn. He is the oldest of five children of Edward Scharfenberger Sr. and Elaine Magdal. Scharfenberger has Russian Jewish ancestry through his mother. His father died in 2015 at the age of 94, and his mother died on November 6, 2019, at the age of 99.

Scharfenberger attended Our Lady of Miraculous Medal Elementary School in Ridgewood, Queens, and graduated from Cathedral Preparatory Seminary High School in Queens in 1965. In 1969, Scharfenberger graduated with a bachelor's degree in English from Cathedral College of the Immaculate Conception in Douglaston, Queens. He earned a Bachelor of Sacred Theology degree in 1972 from the Pontifical Gregorian University in Rome.

Ordination and ministry
Scharfenberger received his priestly ordination on July 2, 1973, in St. Peter's Basilica in Rome by Bishop James Hickey, rector of the North American College. He was incardinated into his native diocese, the Diocese of Brooklyn.

Scharfenberger earned a Licentiate in Sacred Theology from the Academy of St. Alphonsus in Rome in 1977 and a Licentiate of Canon Law from Catholic University of America in Washington, D.C.  in 1980.  He graduated with a J.D. degree from Fordham University in New York City in 1990 and was admitted to the New York State Bar Association in 1991.

Scharfenberger served as pastor of St. Matthias Parish in Ridgewood from 2003 to 2014. In addition to doing pastoral work for decades, he held various roles in the diocesan curia. He served as a member of the diocesan tribunal, a judicial vicar, an adviser to the canonical ordinary, and a promoter of justice and member of the committee for sexually abused children. From 2013, Scharfenberger was the episcopal vicar for the Borough of Queens.

Scharfenberger is polyglot and speaks fluent Italian, Spanish and German. He speaks enough Polish to celebrate Mass, and knows some Hebrew, Russian and Portuguese as well.

Bishop of Albany
On February 11, 2014, Pope Francis appointed Scharfenberger as bishop of the Diocese of Albany. He was consecrated by Cardinal Timothy Dolan on April 10, 2014, at the Cathedral of the Immaculate Conception in Albany.

Apostolic Administrator of Buffalo
On December 4, 2019, Francis appointed Scharfenberger as apostolic administrator of Diocese of Buffalo in New York, following the resignation of Bishop Richard Malone.  According to The New York Times, Malone resigned his post following a Vatican investigation on the handling of sex abuse allegations in Buffalo. Scharfenberger's role was a temporary one; he was expected to lead the diocese until a permanent bishop was appointed. The Times reported that in recent years, Scharfenberger had "gained a reputation for taking a more empathetic approach in his handling of the abuse crisis." At a news conference announcing his appointment, Scharfenberger said, "I am here to walk with you, and I am [here] to help you heal." Scharfenberger's responsibilities as Bishop of Albany were left unchanged. 

On January 15, 2021, Bishop Michael Fisher was installed as bishop of the Diocese of Buffalo, taking over for Scharfenberger.

Views

Abortion
Scharfenberger advocates laws against abortion. In February 2017, Scharfenberger criticized three Catholic politicians,  Albany Mayor Kathy Sheehan, State Assemblywoman Patricia Fahy and US Congressman Paul Tonko, for supporting and attending a rally for Planned Parenthood. In January 2019, Scharfenberger wrote an open letter to New York Governor Andrew Cuomo in response to the passage of the Reproductive Health Act:

Interfaith dialogue
On March 8, 2016, at an interfaith event, Scharfenberger said: "Christians cannot be anti-Semitic and be Christian." In July 2019, Scharfenberger was appointed by Pope Francis as consultor to the Pontifical Commission for Religious Relations with the Jews.

On October 18, 2018, Scharfenberger celebrated the feast day of Our Lady of Walsingham with Dean Leander Harding at the Episcopal Cathedral of All Saints in Albany, a celebration observed both by Catholics and Anglicans. Afterwards, Scharfenberger told the congregation that there were more similarities than differences between the two denominations.

Sexual abuse crisis
Scharfenberger said in 2018 that laypeople should investigate bishops accused of sexual abuse and failure to address cases of sexual abuse. In responding to Cardinal Donald Wuerl's suggestion that a committee of bishops should investigate allegations into other bishops in the aftermath of the sexual abuse scandal of former Cardinal Theodore McCarrick, Scharfenberger said that "we have reached a point where bishops alone investigating bishops is not the answer."

On April 28, 2020, Scharfenberger sent a letter to 23 suspended, as well as accused, Diocese of Buffalo clergy, informing them that due to the Diocese's bankruptcy agreement, the diocese could no longer pay them or provide them with retirement funds, health care, car insurance or dental care, effective May 1, 2020.

Health
Scharfenberger was diagnosed with colon cancer in November 2021, and underwent surgery.

Images

See also

 Catholic Church hierarchy
 Catholic Church in the United States
 Historical list of the Catholic bishops of the United States
 List of Catholic bishops of the United States
 Lists of patriarchs, archbishops, and bishops

References

External links

Roman Catholic Diocese of Albany Official Site

  

21st-century Roman Catholic bishops in the United States
Roman Catholic bishops of Albany
Pontifical North American College alumni
Catholic University of America alumni
1948 births
People from Bushwick, Brooklyn
Living people
American people of German descent
American people of Russian-Jewish descent
Bishops appointed by Pope Francis